Fat City may refer to:

 Fat City (novel), a 1969 novel by Leonard Gardner
 Fat City (film), a 1972 film adaptation, directed by John Huston
 "Fat City" (The King of Queens), a television episode
 Fat City Cycles, an American mountain bike company
 Fat City: How Washington Wastes Your Taxes, a 1980 book by Donald Lambro
 Fat City, a commercial district in Metairie, Louisiana, United States

Music 
 Fat City (Shawn Colvin album), 1992
 Fat City (The Sons of Champlin album), 1967
 Fat City Recordings, UK record label associated with Grand Central Records
 "Fat City", song by Airbourne from Runnin' Wild
 "Fat City (Slight Return)", song by The Twilight Singers from Blackberry Belle
 Starland Vocal Band, American pop band once known as Fat City